George F. Baker (August 20, 1857 – January 29, 1915), born George F. Boecke, was an American Major League Baseball player who played catcher from 1883 to 1886. He played for the Baltimore Orioles, St. Louis Maroons, and Kansas City Cowboys in his four-season career.

References

External links

Major League Baseball catchers
Baltimore Orioles (AA) players
Kansas City Cowboys (NL) players
St. Louis Maroons players
19th-century baseball players
Baseball players from St. Louis
1857 births
1915 deaths
Winona Clipper players
Springfield (minor league baseball) players
Memphis Browns players
Leadville Blues players